The 2021–22 Hellenic Football League season was the 69th in the history of the Hellenic Football League, a football competition in England. For the first time since the 1999–2000 season, the league operates two divisions, the Premier Division at Step 5 and Division One at Step 6.

The allocations for Steps 5 and 6 this season were announced by The Football Association on 18 May 2021.

After the abandonment of the 2019–20 and 2020–21 seasons due to the COVID-19 pandemic in England, numerous promotions were decided on a points per game basis over the previous two seasons.

Premier Division

The Premier Division featured nine clubs which competed in the division last season, along with eleven new clubs.
Clubs, transferred from the Western League:
Bradford Town
Chipping Sodbury Town
Cribbs
Hallen
Roman Glass St George
Westbury United
Clubs, promoted from Division One West:
Hereford Lads Club
Malvern Town
Thorbury Town
Clubs, promoted from Western League First Division:
Calne Town
Corsham Town

League table

Results table

Stadiums and locations

Division One

Division One featured twelve clubs which competed in East and West divisions last season, along with five new clubs.
Clubs, transferred from the West Midlands (Regional) League:
Littleton
Pershore Town
Worcester Raiders
Plus:
Studley, transferred from Midland League Division One
FC Stratford, promoted from Midland League Division Two

League table

Play-offs

Results table

Stadiums and locations

Division Two East

Division Two East featured 9 clubs which competed in the division last season, along with 6 new clubs: 
AFC Aldermaston reserves, transferred from Division Two South
Woodcote & Stoke Rows, transferred from Division Two South, also changed name to Woodcote
Aston Clinton reserves, transferred from Division Two North
Thame United "A"
Procision
Eversley & California reserves

League table

Division Two North

Division Two North featured 9 clubs which competed in the division last season, along with 4 new clubs:
Chinnor, transferred from Division Two East
Abingdon United development, transferred from Division Two South
Woodstock Town, transferred from Division Two South
New Bradwell St Peter development

League table

Division Two South

Division Two South featured 9 clubs which competed in the division last season, along with 5 new clubs:
Fairford Town reserves, transferred from Division Two West
Newbury, joined from the Thames Valley Premier Football League
Carterton
Marlborough Town development
Cricklade Town

League table

Division Two West

Division Two West featured 9 clubs which competed in the division last season, along with 3 new clubs:
New Dales Vale
Longlevens development
Cheltenham Saracens development

League table

References

External links
 Official Site

2021–22
9